Khoshkamrud-e Olya (also Romanized as Khoshkamrūd-e ‘Olyā and Khoshkemrūd-e ‘Olyā; also known as Ḩavārī, Khoshkamrūd-e Bālā, Khoshkeh Marrūd-e ‘Olyā, Khoshkeh Marūd, Khushgeh Marūd, Khushgeh Matūd, and Voshkamarū-ye Bālā) is a village in Yalghuz Aghaj Rural District, Serishabad District, Qorveh County, Kurdistan Province, Iran. At the 2006 census, its population was 70, in 16 families. The village is populated by Kurds.

References 

Towns and villages in Qorveh County
Kurdish settlements in Kurdistan Province